Hereford Hop is a firm cheese, that has a rind of toasted hops. It has been produced since 1990 by Charles Martell, maker of Stinking Bishop. Since then, the cheese has been copied elsewhere by other producers. However, most of those tend to use minced and reformed cheddar, rolled in hop dust.

References

External links
 

English cheeses
Cow's-milk cheeses
Products introduced in 1990
Gloucestershire cuisine
Humulus